Enekbatus eremaeus is a shrub endemic to Western Australia.

It blooms between April and October producing white-pink-purple flowers.

It is found on breakaways, flats, hills and rises in the Mid West and Goldfields-Esperance regions of Western Australia between Wiluna and Kalgoorlie where it grows in sandy-loamy soils.

References

eremaeus
Endemic flora of Western Australia
Myrtales of Australia
Rosids of Western Australia
Plants described in 2010
Taxa named by Malcolm Eric Trudgen
Taxa named by Barbara Lynette Rye